Phillips Crater is a crater in the Mare Australe quadrangle of Mars, located at 66.7° south latitude and 45.1° west longitude.  It is 190.2 km in diameter and was named after John Phillips, a British geologist (1800–1874), and Theodore E. Philips, a British astronomer (1868–1942).

Description
In this area one can often see polygons. Polygonal, patterned ground is quite common in some regions of Mars. It is commonly believed to be caused by the sublimation of ice from the ground. Sublimation is the direct change of solid ice to a gas. This is similar to what happens to dry ice on the Earth. Patterned ground forms in a mantle layer, called latitude dependent mantle.

Gallery
The enlarged pictures below show these features.

See also
 List of craters on Mars: O-Z

References

External links

Mare Australe quadrangle
Impact craters on Mars